Allium petraeum is an Asian species of wild onion native to Xinjiang, Kyrgyzstan, and Kazakhstan. It occurs on cliff faces and other sun-lit rocky places.

Allium petraeum has a cluster of narrow bulbs, each up to 15 mm across. Scape is up to 50 cm tall. Leaves are tubular, just a bit shorter than the scape, about 1 mm in diameter. Umbel is spherical with a dense cluster of yellow flowers. Tepals are pale yellow to bright lemon yellow, each with a green midvein.

References

petraeum
Onions
Flora of Central Asia
Plants described in 1842